Anna is a feminine given name, the Latin form of the  and the Hebrew name Hannah, meaning "favour" or "grace" or "beautiful".

Anna is in wide use in countries across the world as are its variants Ana, Anne, originally a French version of the name, though in use in English speaking countries for hundreds of years, and Ann, which was originally the English spelling. Saint Anne is traditionally the name of the mother of the Virgin Mary, which accounts for its wide use and popularity among Christians. The name has also been used for numerous saints and queens. In the context of pre-Christian Europe, the name can be found in Virgil's Aeneid, where Anna appears as the sister of Dido advising her to keep Aeneas in her city.

Variant forms
Alternate forms of Anna, including spelling variants, short forms, diminutives and transliterations are:
 Aina – Catalan, Latvian, Lithuanian, Hungarian
 An – Dutch
 Ana – Bulgarian, Croatian, English,  Galician, Georgian, Hawaiian, Lithuanian, Macedonian, Portuguese, Romanian, Serbian, Slovene, Spanish, Albanian
 حنا – Arabic
 ანა – Georgian
 Anaïs – Catalan, French, Provençal
 Anano – Georgian
 Anča – Slovak, Romanian
 Ance – Latvian
 Anci – Hungarian
 Ancsa – Hungarian
 Ane – Basque, Danish, Hawaiian
 Anechka – Russian
 Anelie – German
 Anella – Estonian
 Anelle – Estonian
 Anete – Estonian, Latvian
 Anett – Estonian, Hungarian
 Anette – Danish, Estonian, Finnish, Norwegian, Swedish
 Ania – Ukrainian, Polish, Russian
 Anica – Croatian, Romanian, Serbian, Slovene, Spanish
 Anice – Scots
 Anicuta – Portuguese, Romanian
 Anika – Danish, Dutch, German
 Annika – Swedish, Finnish
 Anikó – Hungarian
 Anilla – Hungarian
 Anina – German
 Anissa – English
 Anisa – Albanian
 Anita – Estonian, Finnish, Latvian, Portuguese, Spanish, Swedish, English, Polish, Hungarian
 Anitte – German
 Annychka – Ukrainian
 Anja – Danish, Finnish, German, Norwegian, Serbian,  Slovene, Swedish
 Anka – Bulgarian, Czech, German, Croatian, Polish, Russian, Serbian
 Anke – Frisian, German
 Anne – Danish, English, Estonian, French, Swedish
 Anna – Afrikaans, Armenian, Breton, Bulgarian, Catalan, Czech, Danish, Dutch, English, Estonian, Finnish, French, German, Greek, Hungarian, Icelandic, Italian, Japanese, Korean, Latvian, Malayalam, Norwegian, Polish, Portuguese, Russian (Анна), Slovakian, Swedish, Spanish 
 安娜 – Mandarin Chinese
 アンナ – Japanese
 杏奈 – Japanese
 안나 (An-na) – Korean
 Annaki – Greek
 Annamma – Malayalam
 Annchen – German
 Ann – Danish, Dutch, English, French, German
 Annechien - Dutch
 Anneka – English
 Anneke – Dutch
 Anneli – Estonian, Finnish, Swedish
 Annelie – Danish, German, Norwegian, Swedish
 Annella – Scots
 Annele – Latvian
 Annelle – French
 Annet – Dutch
 Annetta – Italian
 Annette – Danish, Dutch, French, Swedish
 Anni – Estonian, Finnish, German, Swedish
 Annick – Breton
 Annie – Danish, Dutch, English, French, Norwegian, Swedish
 Anniina – Finnish
 Annija – Latvian
 Annika – Dutch, Estonian, Finnish, Latvian, Swedish
 Annike – Estonian
 Anniken – Norwegian
 Anniki – Estonian
 Annikki – Finnish
 Anniņa – Latvian
 Annio – Greek
 Annora – English
 Annouche – French
 Annoula – Greek
 Annu – Finnish
 Annus – Hungarian
 Annukka – Finnish
 Annushka – Russian
 Annuska – Hungarian
 Anona – English
 Anouk – Dutch, French
 Ans – Dutch

 Antje – Dutch, German
 Anu – Estonian, Finnish
 Anushka – Russian
 Anya – Russian
 Anyuta – Russian
 Asya – Russian
 Asenka – Russian
 Chana – Hebrew
 Chanah – Hebrew
 Channah – Hebrew
 Hajnal – Hungarian
 Hana ܚܐܢܐ – Syriac
 Hana – Czech, Lithuanian, Slovak, Turkish
 Hania – Ukrainian, Polish
 Hanna – Belarusian, Danish, Dutch, English, Estonian, Finnish, Ge'ez, German, Icelandic, Norwegian, Polish, Swedish, Ukrainian, Hungarian
 Hannah – Hebrew, Arabic, English, Estonian, Swedish
 Hanne – German, Scandinavian
 Hannela – Estonian
 Hannele – Estonian, Finnish
 Hannelore – German
 Hannusia – Ukrainian
 Hena – Yiddish
 Henda – Yiddish
 Hendel – Yiddish
 Hene – Yiddish
 Henye – Yiddish
 Ona – Hebrew, Lithuanian, Finnish
 Onnee – Manx
 Panka – Hungarian
 Panna – Hungarian
 Panni – Hungarian
 Աննա – Armenian
 แอนนา - Thai language

Composite names including Anna and variants
 Áine – Irish version of Anna
 Anabel – English, Galician, Polish, Spanish, Hungarian
 Anabela – Portuguese
 Anabella – Spanish, English, Hungarian
 Anabelle – English
 Ana Laura - Spanish, Portuguese 
 Analeigh – English 
 Ana Luisa - Spanish, Portuguese
 Ana Maria – Portuguese
 Ana María – Spanish
 Anamaria – English
 Anamaría – Spanish
 Ana-Maria – Romanian
 Ann – Dutch, English
 Annabel – Catalan, Dutch, English, Estonian
 Anna-Bella – English, Swedish
 Annabell – Hungarian
 Annabella – English, German, Italian, Swedish, Hungarian
 Annabelle – English, French
 Annabeth – English
 Anna-Carin – Swedish
 Anna Greta - English, German, Swedish 
 Anna-Greta – Swedish
 Anna Julia - English, German, Swedish 
 Anna-Julia - Swedish 
 Anna Laura - English, German, Swedish 
 Anna-Laura - Swedish 
 Annalee – English
 Annaleigh - English 
 Annaline - English 
 Annalyn - English 
 Annalynne - English 
 Annalyssa - English 
 Anna Lisa - English, German, Swedish 
 Anna-Lisa – Swedish 
 Anna Louisa - English, German, Swedish 
 Anna-Louisa - Swedish 
 Anna Maria – English, German, Swedish, Catalan 
 Anna-Maria – Estonian, Finnish, Polish, Swedish
 Annamaria – Italian
 Annamária – Hungarian
 Ann-Britt – Swedish
 Ann-Charlotte – Swedish
 Ann-Christin – Swedish
 Annegret – German
 Anneke – Dutch
 Annelien – Dutch
 Annelies – Dutch, German
 Anneliese – Dutch, German
 Annelise – Danish
 Anneloes – Dutch
 Annemarie – Dutch, English, German
 Annemiek – Dutch
 Annemieke – Dutch
 Annesophie – German
 Ann-Kristin – Swedish
 Ann-Louise – Swedish
 Ann-Margret – Swedish
 Ann-Mari – Swedish
 Ann-Marie – Swedish
 Annmarie – English
 Ann-Sofi – Swedish
 Ann-Sofie – Swedish
 Ittianna – Malayalam
 Julianna - English, German 
 Julianne - English, French 
 Lauranna - English, German 
 Lauranne - English, French 
 Leann – English
 Leanna – English
 Leanne – English
 Leeann – English
 Lianna - English
 Liliana - Portuguese 
 Lisann – Estonian
 Lisanna – Estonian
 Lisanne – Dutch, English, Estonian
 Luana – English
 Luann – English
 Luanna – English
 Luanne – English
 Lyanna – English, French, Greek, Latin
 Lyanne – English, French, Greek, Latin
 Marian – English, Estonian
 Mariana – Czech, Estonian, Portuguese, Romanian, Spanish
 Mariann – Estonian, Hungarian
 Marianna – Hungarian
 Mari-Ann – Estonian
 Mari-Anna – Estonian
 Marianna – English, Estonian, Finnish, German, Greek,  Hungarian, Italian, Polish, Russian, Slovakian
 Mari-Anne – Estonian
 Marianne – English, Danish, Estonian, French, German, Norwegian, Swedish
 Marijana – Croatian, Serbian, Slovene
 Marjaana – Estonian, Finnish
 Marjaane – Estonian
 Marjan – Dutch
 Marjana – Slovene, Ukrainian
 Maryann – English
 Maryanne – English
 Hanna-Liina – Estonian
 Pollyanna – English
 Rosanna – English, Italian, Portuguese
 Roseanne – English
 Ruthanne – English
 Saranna – English

People
Anna is a very common given name. People with the name include:
Anna, prophetess mentioned in the Gospel of Luke 2:36
Anna Ahlström (1863–1943), Swedish teacher, principal, and school founder
Anna Akhmanova (born 1967), Russian cell biologist
Anna Akhmatova (1889–1966), Russian poet
Anna Anderson (1896–1984), Romanov impostor who claimed she was the Grand Duchess Anastasia of Russia
Anna Apostolaki (1880–1958), Greek archaeologist and museum curator
Anna of Austria (1528–1590), daughter of Ferdinand I, Holy Roman Emperor 
Anne of Austria, Queen of Poland (1573–1598), Queen consort of Poland and Sweden, wife of Sigismund III Vasa
Anna of Austria, Queen of Spain (1549–1580), Queen consort of Spain, wife of Philip II
Anna Fisher Beiler (1848–1904), British-born American missionary, newspaper editor
Anna Benaki-Psarouda (born 1934), Greek politician
Anna Smeed Benjamin (1834-1924), American social reformer 
Anna Bergendahl (born 1991), Swedish singer
Anna Farquhar Bergengren (1865–1???), American writer, editor 
Anna Bijns (1493–1575), Flemish writer, schoolteacher and nun
Anna Blackwell (1816-1900), English writer
Anna Blaman (1905–1960), Dutch writer and poet
Anna Blässe (born 1987), German footballer
Anna Blinkova (born 1998), Russian tennis player
Anna Bochkoltz (1815–1879), German operatic soprano, voice teacher and composer
Anna Borg (1903–1963), Danish-Icelandic actress
Anna Linnikova (born 2000), Russian model and beauty pageant titleholder
Anna Louisa Geertruida Bosboom-Toussaint (1812–1886), Dutch novelist
Anna van der Breggen (born 1990), Dutch racing cyclist
Anna Mae Bullock (born 1938), American singer, better known as Tina Turner
Anna Caballero (born 1955), American politician
Anna Cabana (born 1979), French journalist
Anna Camp (born 1982), American actress and singer
Anna Cathcart (born 2003), Canadian actress
Anna Chakvetadze (born 1987), Russian tennis player
Anna Chatterton, Canadian playwright
Anna Chernenko (1913–2010), First Lady of the Soviet Union
Anna Chlumsky (1980-), actress
Anna Ciddor (born 1957), Australian author and illustrator
Anna Coble (died 2009), American biophysicist
Anna Manning Comfort (1845-1931), American physician
Anna Diamantopoulou (born 1959), Greek politician
Anna Bowman Dodd (1858–1929), American writer
Anna Dániel (1908–2003), Hungarian journalist
Anna Peyre Dinnies (1805–1886), American writer
Anna Dodsworth (c. 1740–1801), British romantic poet
Anna Drijver (born 1983), Dutch actress and model
Anna van Egmont (1533–1558), Dutch noble, first wife of William the Silent
Anna Enquist (born 1945), Dutch poet and novelist
Anna Eriksson, (born 1977) Finnish singer
Anna d'Este (1531–1607), Italian-born French princess
Anna Ewers, (born 1993), German fashion model
Anna Faris, (born 1976) American actress
Anna Friel, (born 1976), English actress
Anna-Maria Galojan (born 1982), Estonian politician, model, and fugitive
Anna Gardner (1816–1901), American abolitionist, poet, teacher
Anna Gerasimou (born 1987), Greek tennis player
Anna Gunn (born 1968), American actress
Anna Gurney (1795–1857), English scholar, philanthropist, geologist and a member of the Gurney family of Norfolk
Anna Haak (born 1996), Swedish volleyball player
Anna Haava (1864–1957), Estonian poet
Anna Roosevelt Halsted (1906-1975), only daughter of president Franklin D. Roosevelt
Anna M. Hammer (1840–1910), American philanthropist and temperance movement leader
Anna Harrison (1775-1864), wife of president William Henry Harrison
Anna of Hohenstaufen (1230–1307), Empress of Nicaea
Anna Makurat (born 2000), Polish basketball player
Anna Morris Holstein (1824–1901), American organizational founder, civil war nurse, author
Anna Hopkins (born 1987), Canadian actress
Anna Hutchison (born 1986) is a New Zealand actress and producer. 
Anna Indermaur (1894–1980), Swiss artist
Anna Iriyama (born 1995), Japanese idol singer (AKB48)
Anna Irwin Young (1873–1920), American mathematician
Anna Jacobsen (1924–2004), Norwegian champion of Southern Sami language and culture
Anna Karen (1936–2022), South African-born British actress
Anna Kendrick (born 1985), American film and stage actress
Anna Khanum (died 1647), Queen consort of Iran, wife of Safi I 
Anna Komnene (1083–1153), daughter of Byzantine Emperor Alexius I and writer of the Alexiad
Anna Korakaki (born 1996), Greek shooter
Anna Kostanyan (born 1987), Armenian politician
Anna Kournikova (born 1981), Russian tennis player
Anna Lapushchenkova (born 1986), Russian tennis player
Anna Lazareva (born 1997), Russian volleyball player
Anna Lewis (suffragette) (1889–1976), British suffragette, member of the militant Women's Social and Political Union.
Anna Lukens (1844-1917), American physician
Anna Magnani (1908–1973), Italian actress
Anna Mantzourani (1935-1991) Greek actress
Anna Margaret Collins (born 1996), American singer-songwriter and actress
Anna Massey (1937–2011), English actress
Anna K. Mapp (born 1970), American Chemist
Anna McAllister (1888–1961), American historian
Anna McGahan (born 1988), Australian actress
Anna McGarrigle (born 1944), Canadian singer
Anna McGurk (1968–1991), British murder victim
Anna McMorrin (born 1971), British politician
Anna de' Medici, Archduchess of Austria (1616–1676), Italian noble, Austrian royal consort
Anna Melyukova (1921–2004), Russian archaeologist
Anna Menconi (born 1971), Italian Paralympic archer
Anna Merz (1931–2013), English conservationist
Anna Mons (1672–1714), Dutch commoner who almost succeeded in marrying Tsar Peter the Great
Anna Murashige (born 1998), Japanese idol singer (HKT48, NMB48)
Anna Nagata (born 1982), Japanese actress
Anna Nanousi, Greek fashion model and television presenter
Anna Navarro (1933–2006), American film and television actress
Anna Neethling-Pohl (1906–1992), South African actress, performer and film producer
Anna de Noailles (1876–1933), Romanian-French writer
Anna Nordqvist (born 1987), Swedish golfer
Anna Notaras (died 1507), Byzantine writer
Anna Ntountounaki (born 1995), Greek swimmer
Anna Palaiologina (died 1320), Byzantine princess
Anna Campbell Palmer (1854-1928), American author, editor
Anna Panayiotopoulou (born 1947), Greek actress
Anna Paquin (born 1982), Canadian-born New Zealand actress
Anna Passey (born 1984), English actress
Anna Patten (born 1999), English footballer
Anna Pavlova (1881–1931), prima ballerina
Anna Pavlovna of Russia (1795–1865), Queen consort of the Netherlands, wife of William II
Anna Pezzetta (born 2007), Italian figure skater 
Anna Augusta Von Helmholtz-Phelan (1880-1964), American professor, author
Anna Polak (1906–1943), Dutch Jewish gymnast
Anna Sophia Polak (1874–1943), Dutch Jewish feminist and author
Anna Pollatou (1983–2014), Greek rhythmic gymnast
Anna Porphyrogenita (963–1011), Grand Princess consort of Kiev
Anna Quayle (1932–2019), English actress
Anna Rezan (born 1992), Greek actress
Anna Rankin Riggs (1835-1908), American social reformer
Anna Hall Roosevelt (1863–1892), mother of Eleanor Roosevelt
Anna of Russia (1693–1740), Empress of Russia
Anna Rutgers van der Loeff (1910–1990), Dutch writer of children's novels
Anna Ruysch (1666–1741), Dutch flower painter
Anna T. Sadlier (1854-1932), Canadian writer, translator 
Anna of Savoy (1306–1365), Byzantine Empress consort
Anna of Saxony (1544–1577), German noble, second wife of William the Silent
Anna Karen (1936–2022), South African-British actress
Anna Karolína Schmiedlová (born 1994), Slovak tennis player
Anna van Schurman (1607–1678), Dutch painter, engraver, poet, and scholar
Anna Sedokova (born 1982), Ukrainian singer, actress and television presenter
Anna Segal (born 1986), Australian Olympic freestyle skier, twice world champion
Anna Seghers (1900–1983), German writer
Anna Seile (1939–2019), Latvian politician
Anna Semenovich (born 1980), Russian singer, actress, model, and former ice dancer
Anna Shcherbakova (born 2004), Russian figure skater
Anna Shechtman (born 1990/1991), American journalist and crossword compiler
Anna Shulgina (born 1993), Russian film and stage actress, singer and TV presenter
Anna Peck Sill (1816-1889), American educator
Anna Skarbek (born 1976), Australian businesswoman and former investment banker
Anna Smashnova (born 1976), Belarus-born Israeli tennis player
Anna Soubry (born 1956), British politician
Anna Spyridopoulou (born 1988), Greek basketball player
Anna-Stina Nilstoft (1928–2017), Swedish artist
Anna Stroka (1923–2020), Polish literary historian and author
Anna Sueangam-iam (born 1998), Thai actress, model and beauty pageant titleholder
Anna Synodinou (1927–2016), Greek actress and politician
Anna Tatishvili (born 1990), Georgian tennis player
Anna Teichmüller (1861–1940), German composer
Anna Thynn, Marchioness of Bath (1943–2022), Hungarian actress and British noblewoman by marriage
Anna Tonelli (c.1763–1846), Italian portrait painter in the late 17th century and early 18th century
Anna Torma (born 1952), Hungarian-Canadian fibre artist
Anna of Trebizond (died 1342), Empress of Trebizond 
Anna Augusta Truitt (1837–1920), American philanthropist, reformer, essayist 	
Anna Tsygankova (born 1979), Russian ballet dancer
Anna Turley (born 1978), British politician
Anna of Tyrol (1585–1618), Holy Roman Empress
Anna van der Vegt (1903–1983), Dutch gymnast
Anna Verouli (born 1956), Greek javelin thrower
Anna Vignoles, British educationalist
Anna Villani (born 1966), Italian marathon runner
Anna Visscher (1584–1651), Dutch artist, poet, and translator
Anna Vissi (born 1957), Greek-Cypriot singer
Anna de Waal (1906–1981), Dutch politician, Secretary of Education
Anna Cabot Lowell Quincy Waterston (1812–1899), American writer
Anna May Waters (1903–1987), Canadian nurse
Anna Weber-van Bosse (1852–1921), Dutch phycologist
Ann Wilkins (1806–1857), American missionary teacher
Anna Wintour (born 1949) British-American fashion journalist and editor-in-chief of the magazine Vogue
Anna Wise (born 1991), American singer
Anna Woltz (born 1981), Dutch writer
Anna Wood (kayaker) (born 1966), Dutch-born Australian sprint canoeist
Anna Zak (born 2001), Israeli singer
 as a masculine name
Anna of East Anglia (died 653 or 654), king of East Anglia

Fictional use
Anna, the sister of Dido, Queen of Carthage, in Roman mythology and later literature
Anna, an alternate name for Morgause of Arthurian legend
 Anna Blake, a character from the Scooby-Doo video-games Scooby-Doo! First Frights and Scooby-Doo! and the Spooky Swamp
Anna Delaney, a character in the Netflix series  Grand Army
Anna De Souza, a character in ITV soap opera Emmerdale
Anna Lightwood, a protagonist from the upcoming series The Last Hours, part of The Shadowhunter Chronicles by Cassandra Clare
Anna Karenina, a main character in a novel written by Leo Tolstoy of the same name
Anna Kakuzawa, a character in the Elfen Leid manga series
Anna Marks, a character in the film He's Just Not That Into You
Anna Marvin, a character in the 1991 American comedy movie What About Bob?
Anna Perenna, the sister of Dido in Roman mythology and later literature
Anna, Princess of Arendelle and the protagonist of Disney's movie Frozen
Anna Schmidt, a character in Mind Your Language
Anna Valerious, a character in the 2004 film Van Helsing
Anna Williams, a character in the Tekken video game series
Anna Windass, a character in ITV soap opera Coronation Street
 A character in the animated series Space Carrier Blue Noah
 A character in Mister God, This Is Anna by Fynn
 The main character in When Hitler Stole Pink Rabbit by Judith Kerr
 Anna or Ti'ana, a character in the Myst games

See also
 Ana (given name)
 Anna (disambiguation)
 Annie (disambiguation)
 Annette (disambiguation)
 Hannah (given name)
Sammarinese given names

Notes

Given names of Greek language origin
Feminine given names
Belarusian feminine given names
Bulgarian feminine given names
Czech feminine given names
Danish feminine given names
Dutch feminine given names
English feminine given names                                                                  
Estonian feminine given names
Filipino feminine given names
Finnish feminine given names 
German feminine given names
Greek feminine given names
Hungarian feminine given names
Icelandic feminine given names
Norwegian feminine given names
Polish feminine given names
Russian feminine given names
Scandinavian feminine given names
Swedish feminine given names
Slavic feminine given names
Japanese feminine given names